Pranav Mistry (born 14 May 1981) is a computer scientist and inventor. He is the former President and CEO of STAR Labs (Samsung Technology & Advanced Research Labs). He is currently the founder and CEO of TWO, an Artificial Reality startup. He is best known for his work on SixthSense, Samsung Galaxy Gear and Project Beyond.

Career
Pranav started his career as an intern in Mircosoft. Following that, he has reportedly worked for Google, CMU, NASA, UNESCO and JST. 

After dropping out from the PhD program of MIT, he served as the Vice President of Samsung Electronics, followed by the Global Vice President and Corporate SVP. In 2019, he was made the President and CEO of STAR Labs. While at Samsung, he was involved in the R&D and launch of Sixthsense, Galaxy Watch, Gear 360, Bixby AR and Project NEON. 

In July 2021, he left Samsung to find a new Artificial Reality startup, TWO.

Innovations
Mistry is best known for his work on SixthSense. Some of his other works include Mouseless, an invisible computer mouse; Sparsh, a novel way to copy-paste data between digital devices; Quickies, intelligent sticky notes; Blinkbot, a blink controlled robot. He has also contributed in the development of Samsung's NEON.

Recognition
Pranav's research on SixthSense earned him the 2009 Invention Award. He was also named on MIT's Technology Review as one of the top 35 innovators in the world. In 2010, He was named on Creativity Magazine's Creativity 50. Chris Anderson has referred Mistry as "one of the best inventors in the world". Mistry has also been listed in "15 Asian Scientists to Watch", by Asian Scientist Magazine. He has also received recognition from GQ India, listing him as one of the most powerful digital Indians, and India Today, listing him as one of the "37 Indians of Tomorrow". 

He was honoured as Young Global Leader 2013, by WEF.

Awards and achievements 
 Young Global Leader 2013 Award, World Economic Forum 
 50 Most Creative People of the Year 2010, CREATIVITY 50
 TR35 2009 award, Technology Review
 Invention of the Year 2009 award, Popular Science
 Nominee for Forbes India's Person of the Year 2009

Personal life
Mistry was born in Palanpur in Gujarat state of India. He married Farrah Chen.

References

External links
 Pranav Mistry's personal homepage
 Pranav Mistry at MIT
 
 Think Tank Team homepage

Human–computer interaction researchers
Indian computer scientists
Massachusetts Institute of Technology alumni
IIT Bombay alumni
1981 births
Living people
Augmented reality
MIT Media Lab people
Gujarati people
People from Banaskantha district
Gesture recognition
Nirma University alumni
Samsung people